Nübao (meaning Women’s Journal in English) was established in 1898 and as such was one of China’s first women's magazines. The founder was Chen Xiefen. It had five goals:
 Abolishing foot binding
 Educating girls
 Freeing marriage
 Jobs for women
 Equality with men.

The headquarters of Nübao was in Shanghai. The magazine was closed by the Chinese government in 1903 due to its anti-government stance.

References

1899 establishments in China
Chinese-language magazines
Defunct magazines published in China
Feminism in China
Feminist magazines
Magazines established in 1898
Magazines disestablished in 1903
Magazines published in Shanghai
Women's magazines published in China
Banned magazines
Censorship in China